The 1967 Florida Gators football team represented the University of Florida during the   1967 NCAA University Division football season. The season was the eighth for Ray Graves as the head coach of the Florida Gators football team.  Graves' 1967 Florida Gators posted a 6–4 overall record and a 4–2 record in the Southeastern Conference (SEC), tying for third among the ten SEC teams.

Schedule

Primary source: 2015 Florida Gators Football Media Guide

Attendance figures: 1968 University of Florida Football (media guide).

Roster

References

Florida
Florida Gators football seasons
Florida Gators football